Spoiler Alert may refer to:

"Spoiler Alert" (How I Met Your Mother), November 12, 2007 episode of American TV sitcom
"Spoiler Alert" (Lucifer), August 21, 2020 episode of American urban fantasy TV series
Spoiler Alert: The Hero Dies, a 2017 memoir written by Michael Ausiello
Spoiler Alert (film), a 2022 film based on the 2017 memoir

See also
Spoiler (disambiguation)